Vicilin is a legumin-associated globulin protein. Vicilin can be described as a storage protein found in legumes such as the pea or lentil. Vicilin is a protein that protects plants from fungi and microorganism. It has been hypothesized it's an allergen in pea allergy responses.

Function of Vicilin 

Vicilin is a globulin present in legumes that assists the storage of proteins. Vicilins are 7S globulins. Sucrose binding, antifungal capabilities, and oxidative stress are a few of the globulin's functions. Vicilin peptides produced by digestion using trypsin or chymotrypsin offer anti-hypersensitive properties.

Vicilin's function was best understood because to the addition of the copper ligand. Vicilin has various significant residues, four of which are involved in copper ion coordination. Vicilin belongs to the cupin family of proteins, therefore metal ligand coordination is common, but Vicilin is the only seed storage protein in this family known to have copper. Due to various enzymatic activities, this inclusion is crucial, because Vicilin's function and mechanism are impacted by these functions.

Vicilin Structure 

Vicilin is made up of one alpha subunit, a single glycerol, and a phosphate ion. The addition of a copper ligand is what helps the structure work out. The N-terminus and C-terminus fold into cupin folds to produce conserved beta barrels. Cupin folds cluster in seed storage proteins, and the presence of a metal ligand influences the protein's catalytic action. The C-terminus and N-terminus generate a cupin fold that is symmetrically centered off the axis. This axis is responsible for all copper ligand incorporation. This copper center's structure has four main residues: Cys-338, Tyr-67, His-340, and His-379. The copper ligand is coupled by a trigonal planar structure generated by cysteine's sulfur. The bond formed by a hydroxyl group attached to Tyr-67 is longer than the previous three. The enzymatic activity is connected to copper binding via histidine residues. These copper ligands are known to perform a catalytic function on proteins.

This copper center's structure has four main residues: Cys-338, Tyr-67, His-340, and His-379. The copper ligand is coupled by a trigonal planar structure generated by cysteine's sulfur. The bond formed by a hydroxyl group attached to Tyr-67 is longer than the previous three. The enzymatic activity is connected to copper binding via histidine residues. These copper ligands are known to perform a catalytic function on proteins.

Allergen Related Information 
Vicilin is a significant allergen found in legumes. The LgE binding proteins found were closely related and belonged to the 7S globulin family of seed storage proteins, which helped identify the allergen.  Cross-reactions with various legumes are common when Pis s 1 and vicilins are combined in other seeds.

Major Vicilin Allergens 

 Ana o 1 in cashew nut
 Ara h 1 in peanut
 Jug r 2 in walnut
 Cor a 11 in hazelnut

Vicilins have similar amino acid sequences and cross-reactivity happen between vicilin allergens.

Plant proteins